Richard Asa Hartford (born 24 October 1950) is a Scottish former football player and coach. He started his professional career with West Bromwich Albion. His early progress led to a proposed transfer to Leeds United in November 1971, but this collapsed when a medical examination discovered a heart condition. Hartford instead moved to Manchester City in 1974. He helped City win the 1976 League Cup Final. After a brief spell with Nottingham Forest, Hartford moved to Everton in 1979 and then had a second spell with Manchester City. After playing for Fort Lauderdale Sun, Hartford joined Norwich City. His shot resulted in the only goal of the 1985 League Cup Final.

Hartford was also a regular in the Scotland national team, earning 50 caps between 1972 and 1982. He was selected for the Scotland squads in the 1978 and 1982 World Cups. Towards the end of his playing career, Hartford became a coach. He was the player/manager of Stockport County and Shrewsbury Town. Since retiring as a player, Hartford has worked in a variety of coaching and scouting roles.

Career
He first played for Drumchapel Amateurs in Glasgow, but began his professional career at West Bromwich Albion in 1967. During his time with West Brom, the team won the 1968 FA Cup Final (although he did not play in the final), were beaten FA Cup semi-finalists in 1969 and reached the League Cup final in 1970.

A proposed transfer to Don Revie's Leeds United in November 1971 was cancelled, when the Leeds doctor found that Hartford had a hole in-the-heart condition during a pre-transfer medical examination. He was eventually transfer listed by then West Brom coach Don Howe, alongside favourites Len Cantello and Jeff Astle, in April 1974. Hartford moved on to Manchester City for £210,000, making his debut for City in a 4–0 victory against West Ham. He helped City win the 1976 League Cup Final.

At the beginning of the 1979–80 season he was transferred to Brian Clough's Nottingham Forest (to replace Archie Gemmill) for £500,000, only to be sold on to Everton for £400,000 after just three games with Forest. In October 1981 John Bond brought him back to Manchester City for £375,000. His second stint with City was less successful, as he suffered an ankle injury and the club were relegated in 1983. Hartford left City in 1984 and signed for American club Fort Lauderdale Sun.

He returned to English football soon afterwards with Norwich City. In the 1985 League Cup Final, Hartford's shot was deflected by Sunderland's Gordon Chisholm for the only goal of the match. They were relegated in the same season.

He then had stints with Bolton Wanderers and Oldham Athletic, and then took up coaching/managerial roles with Stockport County and Shrewsbury Town.

International career
Hartford made his full international debut for Scotland on 26 April 1972, in a friendly match with Peru. Hartford made six appearances for Scotland during 1972, but was not selected again until October 1975.

He became a regular in the international side in 1977, as Scotland defeated Czechoslovakia and Wales to qualify for the 1978 World Cup in Argentina. Brian Glanville, in his frequently updated The Story of the World Cup, wrote "The Scots had an abundance of fine midfield players at a time when most other countries looked for them desperately; Bruce Rioch, Don Masson, Asa Hartford, Archie Gemmill, Lou Macari, Graeme Souness". Hartford played in all Scotland games in Argentina. His side lost 3–1 to Peru, drew 1–1 with Iran and defeated eventual runners-up Netherlands 3–2, which meant that Ally MacLeod's team exited the competition after the first round.

Hartford's international career came to an end after the 1982 World Cup, where he recorded his 50th and final cap for Scotland in the game against Brazil. This appearance secured Hartford a place on the national team's roll of honour, as the 8th player to make 50 appearances for Scotland. Hartford did not appear in any other matches at the 1982 World Cup, as Scotland were again eliminated after the group stage.

Coaching and managerial career
Hartford served Stockport County (1987–89) and Shrewsbury Town (1990–91) as a player/manager before his retirement as a player. He subsequently joined ex-international teammates Kenny Dalglish (at Blackburn Rovers), Joe Jordan and Lou Macari (at Stoke City where he spent four matches as caretaker manager) in various coaching/managerial roles. He became assistant manager at Manchester City in 1995, working with Alan Ball. He was caretaker manager in September 1996, after Ball left, but he did not express any interest in becoming manager on a permanent basis. He stayed with City for several years as their reserve team coach, until Stuart Pearce brought in his own coaching staff in May 2005.

Hartford became a first team coach with Blackpool in December 2005, but left the club in May 2006. On 29 June 2007 it was announced that he had been appointed assistant manager at Macclesfield Town but both he and Ian Brightwell were sacked in February 2008 to be replaced by Keith Alexander. In April 2008 he was given a role with Accrington Stanley coaching the junior teams and the reserves, but was made redundant from this role in October 2011. He subsequently worked for Birmingham City as a scout.

Career statistics

As a player
Sourced from 

A.  The "Other" column constitutes appearances and goals in the Anglo-Italian Cup, Anglo-Scottish Cup, FA Charity Shield, Football League Trophy, Football League play-offs Texaco Cup, UEFA Cup, UEFA Cup Winners' Cup, Watney Cup.

As a manager

Honours

Club

Manchester City
Football League Cup: 1976
Norwich City
Football League Cup: 1985

Individual
Scotland national football team roll of honour : 1982

See also
List of footballers in England by number of league appearances (500+)
List of footballers with the most official appearances
List of Scotland national football team captains

References
 Specific

 General
Glanville, Brian – World Cup. The Story of the, Faber & Faber, London, 2005.

External links

Career information at ex-canaries.co.uk

1950 births
Living people
Sportspeople from Clydebank
Footballers from West Dunbartonshire
Scottish footballers
Scotland international footballers
Association football midfielders
West Bromwich Albion F.C. players
Manchester City F.C. players
Nottingham Forest F.C. players
Everton F.C. players
Norwich City F.C. players
Bolton Wanderers F.C. players
Oldham Athletic A.F.C. players
Shrewsbury Town F.C. managers
Fort Lauderdale Sun players
Blackburn Rovers F.C. non-playing staff
Blackpool F.C. non-playing staff
Bolton Wanderers F.C. non-playing staff
1978 FIFA World Cup players
1982 FIFA World Cup players
English Football League players
Scottish expatriate footballers
United Soccer League (1984–85) players
English Football League managers
Drumchapel Amateur F.C. players
Scotland under-21 international footballers
Scotland under-23 international footballers
Manchester City F.C. non-playing staff
Scottish expatriate sportspeople in the United States
Expatriate soccer players in the United States
Scottish football managers